Abril Méndez (Caracas, Venezuela, July 20, 1967) is a talented Venezuelan actress and producer. She has acted in several Venezuelan soap operas such as Inmensamente Tuya, Alba Marina, Niña Bonita, La Revancha, La Mujer Prohibída. In Venezuelan and Latin American films such as A La salida nos vemos, Río Negro, Profundo, Un Domingo Feliz, Música Nocturna.

Sources

 
Image of Abril Méndez

Year of birth missing (living people)
Venezuelan television actresses
Living people
Venezuelan telenovela actresses